is a world mathematics certification program and examination established in Japan in 1988.

Outline of Suken 
Each Suken level (Kyu) has two sections. Section 1 is calculation and Section 2 is application.

Passing Rate 
In order to pass the Suken, you must correctly answer approximately 70% of section 1 and approximately 60% of section 2.

Levels

Level 5 (7th grade math) 
The examination time  is 180 minutes for section 1, 60 minutes for section 2.

Level 4 (8th grade) 
The examination time is 60 minutes for section 1, 60 minutes for section 2.

3rd Kyu, suits for 9th grade 
The examination time is 60 minutes for section 1, 60 minutes for section 2.

Levels 5 - 3 include the following subjects:
 Calculation with negative numbers
 Inequalities
 Simultaneous equations
 Congruency and similarities
 Square roots
 Factorization
 Quadratic equations and functions
 The Pythagorean theorem
 Probabilities

Level pre-2 (10th grade) 
The examination time is 60 minutes for section 1, 90 minutes for section 2.

Level 2 (11th grade) 
The examination time is 60 minutes for section 1, 90 minutes for section 2.

Level pre-1st (12th grade) 
The examination time is 60 minutes for section 1, 120 minutes for section 2.

Levels pre-2 - pre-1 include the following subjects:
 Quadratic functions
 Trigonometry
 Sequences
 Vectors
 Complex numbers
 Basic calculus
 Matrices
 Simple curved lines
 Probability

Level 1 (undergrad and graduate) 
The examination time is 60 minutes for section 1, 120 minutes for section 2.

Level 1 includes the following subjects:
 Linear algebra
 Vectors
 Matrices
 Differential equations
 Statistics
 Probability

References

External links 
Suken(in Japanese)
Suken USA

Mathematics competitions